WLCN is an FM radio station based in Atlanta, Illinois. Its morning show is hosted by Jim Ash. Also Jeff Maxwell hosts the classic rock experience every night from six to midnight. The format of the station is country music. It appears at 96.3 FM. The LCN is intended to be a reference to nearby Lincoln, Illinois. The station's power is 6,000 watts effective radiated power. The station used to be WMNW playing classic rock. WLCN is the flagship station for Lincoln Community High School football and basketball games.

External links
 

LCN